Love to Love You Baby is the second studio album by American singer Donna Summer, released on August 27, 1975, and her first to be released internationally and in the United States. Her previous album Lady of the Night (1974) was released only in the Netherlands. The album was commercially successful, mainly because of the success of its title track, which reached number 2 on the US Pop charts despite some radio stations choosing not to play the song due to its sexually explicit nature. 

On the US Billboard 200, the album peaked at number 11 and became her first top 20 studio album but also was her last until the release of I Remember Yesterday in 1977. To date, it remains one of Summer's most successful records.

History
In the summer of 1974, Summer approached producers Giorgio Moroder and Pete Bellotte with an idea for a song. A re-issued 45 of "Je t'aime... moi non plus" by Jane Birkin and Serge Gainsbourg was back on the charts, prompting Summer to pen her own 'racy' song. She had come up with the lyric "love to love you, baby" as the possible title for the song. Moroder in particular was interested in developing the new disco sound that was becoming increasingly popular, and used Summer's idea to develop the song into an overtly sexual disco track. The original three-minute single was released several times before it had any success – and later edited versions of the re-recorded much longer track were the versions which became a major international hit, almost a year later. He had the idea that she should moan and groan orgasmically, but Summer was initially reticent. Eventually she agreed to record the song as a demo for other singers to hear and possibly record and release. She stated she was not completely sure of some of the lyrics, and parts of the song were improvised while recording. She stated on a VH1's Behind the Music program that she pictured herself as Marilyn Monroe acting out the part of someone in sexual ecstasy. Moroder liked Summer's recording and insisted it should actually be released. Summer reluctantly agreed and the song, titled "Love to Love You", was released to modest success in Europe.

The song, however, still did not have a US release after modest success in Europe. Moroder took it to Casablanca Records and label president Neil Bogart eventually decided to release it, but requested Moroder produce a version near twenty minutes. Summer, Moroder, and producer Pete Bellotte returned with a seventeen-minute version. Casablanca signed Summer and issued the single in November 1975 as "Love to Love You Baby". Casablanca distributed Summer's work in the US while other labels distributed it in different nations during this period.

"Love to Love You Baby" was Summer's first single and first hit in America, reaching #2 on the Billboard Hot 100 singles chart in early 1976. It also became her first number-one Hot Dance Club Play Chart hit. The album (side one of which was completely taken up with the full-length version of the title track) was also released in late 1975 and was soon certified gold for sales of over 500,000 copies in the US. The song was branded "graphic" by some music critics and was even banned by some radio stations for its explicit content. Time later reported that a record twenty-two orgasms were simulated by Summer in the making of the song. In some areas of the music press, Summer would later begin to be dubbed 'The First Lady of Love'. The album made the Top 20 in both the US and the UK.

The other songs on the album had a more soul/R&B feel to them. Side two consisted of four more original songs, plus a reprise of one of them. Two of the songs, "Full of Emptiness" (which was taken from her previous album Lady of the Night) and "Whispering Waves" were ballads, while "Need-a-Man Blues" was in a slightly more pop/disco vein, and "Pandora's Box" was more mid-tempo.

The track listing for side B differs in some European nations.  In the Netherlands the album was released with the single "Virgin Mary" replacing the first version of "Full of Emptiness".  On some releases in Germany, "Whispering Waves" and both versions of "Full of Emptiness" were removed.  They were replaced by "Lady of the Night" and "The Hostage", both taken from the Lady of the Night album.   In France, "The Hostage" was added as a bonus track at the end of side B.

Track listing

Original release

Alternate European track listings
All releases retained the same track listing for side one

Personnel
Donna Summer – lead vocals
Molly Moll, Nick Woodland, Pete Bellotte – guitar
Dave King – bass guitar
Michael Thatcher – keyboards
Giorgio Moroder – keyboards, percussion
Martin Harrison – drums
Franz Deuber – string session
Bernie Brocks – percussion
Lucy, Betsy, Gitta – backing vocals

Production
Pete Bellotte – producer
Giorgio Moroder – arranger, mix-down engineer
Michael Thatcher – string and horn arrangements
Reinhold Mack, Hans Menzel – recording engineers
Lazzaroni, Zill – photography
Stephen Lumel/Gribbitt! – art direction and design

Charts

Certifications

References

External links

1975 albums
Albums produced by Giorgio Moroder
Albums produced by Pete Bellotte
Donna Summer albums
Casablanca Records albums